Thākur is a crater on Mercury. Its name was adopted by the International Astronomical Union (IAU) in 1976. Thākur is named for the Indian writer Rabindranath Tagore.

Scarps in the central and southern part of the crater enclose an area that is at a lower elevation than the rest of the crater.  The scarps extend to the south out of the crater.

References

Impact craters on Mercury